Minuscule 683 (in the Gregory-Aland numbering), ε 357 (von Soden), is a Greek minuscule manuscript of the New Testament, on parchment. Palaeographically it has been assigned to the 13th century. The manuscript has complex contents. Scrivener labelled it by 1145e.

Description 

The codex contains the text of the four Gospels, on 206 parchment leaves (size ). The text is written in one column per page, 28 lines per page.

Text 

The Greek text of the codex Kurt Aland did not place in any Category.

According to the Wisse's Profile Method it has mixed text in Luke and is significantly diverge form Kx in Luke 1. In Luke 10 and Luke 20 it represents Kx.

History 

Scrivener and Gregory dated the manuscript to the 13th century. Currently the manuscript is dated by the INTF to the 13th century.

It was previously in the private collation of the Earl of Leicester at Holkham Hall, before it was purchased by the Bodleian Library in 1956.

It was added to the list of New Testament manuscript by Scrivener (1145) and Gregory (683).

The manuscript is now housed at the Bodleian Library (Holkham Gr. 4) in Oxford.

See also 

 List of New Testament minuscules
 Biblical manuscript
 Textual criticism

References

Further reading 

 

Greek New Testament minuscules
13th-century biblical manuscripts
Bodleian Library collection